The 2003–04 season was the 92nd season in the history of CD Tenerife and the club's second consecutive season in the second division of Spanish football. In addition to the domestic league, CD Tenerife participated in this season's edition of the Copa del Rey.

Pre-season and friendlies

Competitions

Overall record

Segunda División

League table

Results summary

Results by round

Matches

Copa del Rey

References

CD Tenerife seasons
Tenerife